Rodoč is a populated settlement in the Mostar municipality, just south of the city of Mostar, making it a suburb.

History

During the Bosnian War of the 1990s, the Serb forces temporally occupied the southern parts of the city of Mostar, including Rodoč. They burned down about 80% of the houses. Many people were either killed or taken to camps, predominantly in Bileća or in Montenegro. For the tortures in the camps located in Montenegro couple of people were prosecuted as war criminals in Montenegro. After the liberation of the southern parts of the city and Rodoč, many people returned to their homes.

Demographics 
According to the 2013 census, its population was 3,257.

Sports
Local football club HNK Branitelj play their home games at the Stadion Sportskog Centra.

References

Populated places in Mostar
Villages in the Federation of Bosnia and Herzegovina